Bimal Ghosh (born 29 June 1956) is an Indian former footballer and the current head coach of Tollygunge Agragami.

Coaching career

Air India
During the first ever National Football League season in 1996–97, Ghosh was the coach the Air India FC.

Mumbai Tigers
In 2012, Ghosh became the first ever manager of Mumbai Tigers, a start-up team based in Mumbai in the I-League 2nd Division, then named Dodsal Football Club. On 1 September 2012, in Dodsal's first ever tournament, the 2012 Durand Cup, Ghosh led his side to the final where they would face, and lose, to his former side Air India FC 3–2 on penalties.

Nagpur
In February 2016, it was confirmed that Ghosh was coaching Nagpur Football Club during the YMFC Centennial All India Football tournament.

Tollygunge Agragami F.C.
In August 2018, Ghosh was appointed as the head coach of Calcutta Football League side Tollygunge Agragami.

Coach

References

1956 births
Living people
Indian football managers
I-League managers
Air India FC managers
Tollygunge Agragami FC managers